Milcah ( Mīlkā, related to the Hebrew word for "queen") was the 
daughter of Haran and the wife of Nahor, according to the genealogies of Genesis. She is identified as the grandmother of Rebecca in biblical tradition, and some texts of the Midrash have identified her as Sarahs sister.

Sister of Sarah
One of the Yahwist passages from Genesis identifies Haran as the father of Iscah and Milcah. Some rabbinic texts within the Midrashic tradition have identified the aforementioned Iscah as Sarah. According to the Babylonian Talmud, Rabbi Isaac Nappaha, who was one of the Palestinian rabbis, said that Iscah and Sarah were the same person: "And why was she called Iscah? Because she saw through the Holy Spirit".

Ancestor of Rebecca
She is identified as the grandmother of Rebecca in the Book of Genesis, but some scholars believe that Milcah may have originally been Rebeccas mother. They have argued that Bethuel, who is identified as Rebecca's father by the priestly source, was a later addition to the text, and that Rebecca was the daughter of Milcah and Nahor.

Marriage to Nahor and descendants
According to Genesis Chapter 22, Milcah and Nahor have eight children: Uz, Buz, Kemuel, Chesed, Hazo, Pildash, Jidlaph, and Bethuel. Targum Jonathan says that Providence granted Milcah conception in the merit of her sister Sarah. Milcah's son Bethuel moves to Padan-aram (also called Aram-Naharaim) and fathers Rebekah. Milcah's granddaughter Rebekah eventually marries Milcah's nephew Isaac and gave birth to Jacob who became Israel. There is a midrash that Milcah was the forbearer of all prophets in the non-Jewish world.

Incest
Ibn Ezra wrote in his commentary on Gen. 11:29 that Haran, Milcah's father, was a different person from Haran, Abraham's brother. Milcah was married to Nahor, who was also a brother of Abraham. Under Ibn Ezra's interpretation Milcah's husband was not also her uncle.

In the Babylonian Talmud, Rabbi Isaac presumes that the two men with the name Haran are one person. If that is true, then Milcah married to her uncle. Although Leviticus would later outlaw marriages between aunt and nephew ( 20:19), it did not rule out marriage between uncle and niece.  (See, e.g., Gunther Plaut, The Torah: a Modern Commentary, 881.  New York: UAHC, 1981.)  The Talmud approved of a man who married his sister's daughter. (Yevamot 62b-63a.)  And in the Talmud, Rabbi Isaac equates Milcah's sister Iscah with Sarah (then Sarai), in which case Abraham would have married his brother Harans daughter.

See also
Bethuel
Chayei Sarah
Genesis
Tanakh
Hebrew Bible

References

Book of Genesis people
Women in the Hebrew Bible